Abubakar Nagar is one of the oldest areas of Deoria district in the Indian state of Uttar Pradesh.

Abubakar nagar is named after Maulana Hakeem Abubakar (19 October 1879 – 10 January 1970), a renowned Hakeem, scholar and Teacher. Father of Maulana Abubakar, Haji Mahmood Ali was a well-known businessman and social worker of Calcutta [kolkata].After strongly opposing the British rule, Haji Mahmood had to flee from Calcutta and after wandering in many places, he finally reached Ghazipur.   

Area in Deoria district